The 1935 Brooklyn Dodgers season was their sixth in the National Football League. The team improved on their previous season's output of 4–7, winning five games. They failed to qualify for the playoffs for the fourth consecutive season.

Schedule

Standings

References

Brooklyn Dodgers (NFL) seasons
Brooklyn Dodgers (NFL)
Brooklyn
1930s in Brooklyn
Flatbush, Brooklyn